Prince Lincoln Thompson, known as Sax (10 July 1949 in Jonestown, Kingston, Jamaica – 14 January 1999 in London, England), was a Jamaican singer, musician and songwriter with the reggae band the Royal Rasses, and a member of the Rastafari movement. He was noted for his high falsetto singing voice, very different from his spoken voice.

Career
He began his recording career as a harmony singer along with Cedric Myton of The Congos in 1967, in a band called The Tartans, who then split up in 1969. In 1971 he was taken on by Coxsone Dodd, and recorded three songs with him at Studio One called "Daughters of Zion", "True Experience" and "Live Up to Your Name".  In 1974, he recorded the Humanity album with Cedric Myton, Clinton Hall and Keith Peterkin, and set up the God Sent label. 
He had two hit singles with "Kingston 11" and "Love the Way It Should Be". 

In 2010, the song, "Humanity (Love the Way It Should Be)" was covered by the American singer John Legend backed by the Philadelphia band, The Roots, and was featured on Legend's album, Wake Up!.

Prince Lincoln received a record deal in 1978, he was signed up by Mo Claridge, who at the time ran Ballistics Records, a London offshoot of United Artists, and who noticed his "eery falsetto". A single "Unconventional People" was released as a 12-inch single in March 1979 with the Humanity album following in May. In mid 1979, the Royal Rasses recorded a second Prince Lincoln album, Experience, this time without Cedric Myton. This album contained more than just the traditional drum and bass sound of most reggae. The band renamed themselves the Rasses to avoid confusion with fellow reggae band The Royals to record a further album called Natural Wild in 1980. This time the music was recorded in London. Prince Lincoln's decision to invite English rock musician Joe Jackson was controversial, and the album was a commercial flop.

Thompson returned to Jamaica and re-set up the successful God Sent label, with the help of German company Juicy Peeple to produce his fourth album, Ride with the Rasses in 1982. This music was recorded at Tuff Gong and Channel One studios. Around this time he and his family moved to Tottenham, London, England, where he opened an Ital shop called The Rasses Fish Mart and Grocery Store. In September 1983, he recorded Rootsman Blues in Addis Ababa studio in London. It was released by Target Records with only three musicians per track, giving the music the intimate quality of chamber music.

He released a final album, 21st Century in 1997 after someone from the United States heard the music in Prince Lincoln's shop, and agreed to become a sponsor. This final album was also recorded in London.

Thompson died in January 1999, in London, at the age of 49.

Discography

Singles
"Daughters of Zion" (1971)
"True Experience" (1971)
"Live Up to Your Name" (1971)

Albums
Humanity 1979
Experience 1979 (The lyrics from "Walk in Jah light" and "Thanksgiving" have been used to explain the doctrine of physical immortality at Rastafari movement).
Harder na Rass 1979
Natural Wild 1980
Ride with the Rasses 1982
Rootsman Blues 1983 also titled Unite The World
21st Century 1997

References

External links
Biography
Reggae vibes
Interview with Cedric Myton about Prince Lincoln

1949 births
1999 deaths
Jamaican reggae musicians
Musicians from Kingston, Jamaica
Performers of Rastafarian music
Jamaican Rastafarians
Roots Reggae Library